Tyrion may refer to:

Animals
Tyrion, a California condor in the Oregon Zoo

Fictional characters
Tyrion Lannister, a character from A Song of Ice and Fire and Game of Thrones
Tyrion, father of the title character in the animated series Tabaluga
Tyrion, a High Elf from Warhammer Fantasy